Dixon may refer to:

Places

International
 Dixon Entrance, part of the Inside Passage between Alaska and British Columbia

Canada
 Dixon, Ontario

United States
 Dixon, California
 Dixon, Illinois
 Dixon, Greene County, Indiana 
 Dixon, Indiana and Ohio, an unincorporated community in Allen County, Indiana and Van Wert County, Ohio
 Dixon, Iowa
 Dixon, Kentucky
 Dixon, New Orleans
 Dixon, Michigan
 Dixon, Missouri
 Dixon, Montana
 Dixon, Nebraska
 Dixon, New Mexico
 Dixon, South Dakota
 Dixon, Wyoming
 Dixon County, Nebraska
 Dixon Lane-Meadow Creek, California

Other
 Dixons Creek, Victoria, Australia

Other uses
 Dixon (surname)
 Dixon (DJ) (born 1975), German house and techno DJ and producer
 Dixon, drummer in an early line-up of Siouxsie and the Banshees
 Dixon of Dock Green, BBC TV police series
 Dixon Ticonderoga, a pencil manufacturer
 Dixon (Shacklefords, Virginia)
 USS Dixon (AS-37), a U.S. Navy submarine tender

See also
 Dickson (disambiguation)
 Dikson (disambiguation)
 Dixon Springs (disambiguation)
 Dixon Township (disambiguation)
 Dixons (disambiguation)
 Justice Dixon (disambiguation)